Sherman Williams may refer to:

 Sherman Williams (American football) (born 1971), former professional American football running back
 Sherman Williams (boxer) (born 1972), Bahamian heavyweight boxer

See also
 Sherman Williams House and Fruit Barn, a historic home and barn in Jerusalem, Yates County, New York